The Atchison Commission (Public Service Commission) was set up in 1886 under the chairmanship of Sir Charles Umpherston Aitchison to come up with a scheme for fulfilling the claims of Indians to higher and more extensive employment in public service. It made the following recommendations in its report submitted in 1887:

 The two-tier classification of civil services into covenanted and uncovenanted should be replaced by a three-tier classification-Imperial, provincial and subordinate civil services.
 The maximum age for entry into civil services should be 23 years.
Commission was set up by lord Dufferin
 The statutory civil service system of recruitment should be abolished.
 The competitive exam should not be held simultaneously in England and India
 Certain percentage of posts in the imperial civil service should be filled by promotion of the members of provincial civil service.

The above recommendations were implemented and consequently the statutory civil service was abolished in 1892.

Indian Civil Service